Goldsberry Track is the home of the Ohio Bobcats women's track and field team. It has been home to the program since the facility opened in May 2000. 
The facility is regarded as one of the best track and field facilities in the Mid-American Conference and the region. 

Goldsberry Track has a potential to hold 1,000 spectators in the red-brick grandstand located on the east side of the stadium. There is also a spacious press box on the stadium's east side and a high quality sound system installed at the stadium. The track at the facility is covered by Rekortan (a mixture of rubber granules with a liquid fixative on top of asphalt). The track surrounds Pruitt Field, an artificial turf field used by the Bobcat's women's field hockey squad, and the Ohio University Marching 110. In the summer of 2006, professional quality lights were installed at Goldsberry Track.

A variety of events are held at Goldsberry Track every year. The Ohio Bobcats track and field teams annually host the McDonald’s Invitational and the Ohio Open for both men's and women's teams. In 2005, Goldsberry Track hosted the Mid-American Conference Track and Field Championships. 

Goldsberry Track is named in honor of Blaine R. Goldsberry.  An Ohio student-athlete (1911-1914), team physician (1921-1953), and athletic contributor, Goldsberry graduated from Ohio University in 1914 and was a lifelong supporter of Bobcats athletics.

External links
Goldsberry Track
Ohio University athletics

Athletics (track and field) venues in Ohio
College track and field venues in the United States
Sports venues in Ohio
Buildings and structures of Ohio University
Tourist attractions in Athens County, Ohio
2000 establishments in Ohio
Sports venues completed in 2000
Ohio Bobcats track and field